Edinburgh Collegiate School was located at 27/28 Charlotte Square, Edinburgh.  The school was established in 1868.

Notable former pupils 

 Thomas Hastie Bryce (1862–1946), anatomist, medical author and archaeologist
 W. K. Burton (1856–1899), engineer, photographer and photography writer, who lived most of his career in Meiji period Japan
 Henry Cowan (1862–1932), Liberal Member of Parliament (MP) 1906–22, Unionist MP 1923–29
 William James Cullen, Lord Cullen (1859–1941), lawyer and judge, Sheriff of Fife and Kinross, Senator of the College of Justice
 Sir Frederick Gebbie (1871–1939), British civil engineer in India
 Archibald Alexander Gordon (1867–1949), British soldier who served as attaché to the Military Household of King Albert I of Belgium during World War I
 Field Marshal Douglas Haig, 1st Earl Haig (1861–1928), British senior officer during the First World War
 Henry Halcro Johnston (1856–1939), Scottish botanist, physician, rugby union international
 Alfred Edward Moffat (1863–1950), Scottish musician, composer and collector of music
 Sir James Thorburn (1864–1929), British colonial Governor of the Gold Coast 1910–12

References 

Educational institutions established in 1868
1868 establishments in Scotland
Defunct private schools in Edinburgh